Healthcare in Washington may refer to:

 Healthcare in Washington (state)
 Healthcare in Washington, D.C.